An Israeli vehicle registration plate, or an Israeli license plate, is a vehicle registration plate, a metal or plastic plate or plates attached to a motor vehicle or trailer, used in Israel for official identification purposes.

Israeli registration plates are issued by various approved licensing firms, like Dinamometer, and according to Specification no. 327 of the Standards Institute of Israel. Most regulations regarding Israeli vehicle registration plates are listed among the transport regulations, issued by the Ministry of Transport and Road Safety. These regulations define the proper placement of the plates, as well as other issues concerning the usage of the plates.

Appearance

Civil registration plates

Israeli civil registration plates are rectangular with reflecting yellow background and embossed with black registration number. Under the first dash of the registration number (see below form of registration numbers) there is a stamp of approval of the Standards Institute of Israel. On the left side of the plate there is a euroband embossed with the Israeli flag and beneath it the letters IL and ישראל (Israel) written in Hebrew and below it إسرائيل (Israel) written in Arabic. Old plates do not hold this euroband. In American standard plates (300 x 150mm), the digits are narrower and the blue rectangle is at the bottom of the plate, as the letters are to the right of the flag.

These plates are issued to Israeli citizens, whether they live in Israel-proper (including annexed territories of Golan Heights and East Jerusalem) or in the West Bank, as well as to Syrian citizens inhabiting in the Golan Heights, and Palestinian residents of East Jerusalem. Vehicles with this format of license plates are free to cross the Green Line, but not into the Gaza Strip unless they receive a permit from COGAT. Palestinians living in the West Bank and Gaza Strip are issued a different registration plate format by the Palestinian Authority. The owners of these vehicles need to apply for a permit from COGAT if they want to cross the Green Line or exit the Gaza Strip.

Vehicles registered in Israel often use 'disguised' plates, either remade black on white without the blue band, or with the blue band covered, when travelling outside of the country.

Current format- 8 digits
Current civil registration numbers (since July 2017) consist of eight digits, separated by dashes between the third and fourth digits and between the fifth and sixth digits (XXX-XX-XXX). 

In this format, The first 6 digits are the registration code. the last two digits are the series of the license plate start from 01 and only go up when the first 6 digits reach their limit (999-99-9##). Thus, the code pattern follow this:
 From 100-00-001 to 999-99-901
 Then, 01 becomes 02 and the rest of the code resets, thus:
 From 100-00-002 to 999-99-902
 Then 100-00-003 to 999-99-903
 and onward...

Typical 1-line license plate, having a size compliant with that of European Union license plates, 520 x 110 mm

Typical 2-line license plate, installed on imported vehicles that can't accommodate a standard 1-line plate. Size compliant with American standard 300 x 150 mm

Motorcycle, Moped, and Scooter License Plate. 165 x 175 mm

1980-2017 - 7 digits

Registration numbers from 1980-2017 were seven digits, separated by dashes between the second and third digits and between the fifth and sixth digits (XX-XXX-XX). Older registration numbers, which are still seen in Israel, consist of five or six digits with one dash placed prior to the last three digits (XX-XXX or XXX-XXX). Vehicles from the same importer or brand usually have the two last digits in common. Special numbers consisting of identical digits or other patterns, may be granted as a premium by the dealership.

While the vehicle registration numbers of taxis in Israel always end with either 25 or 26, the last two digits of buses vary, although many end with 01. Many self-imported cars end with 00, as well as many trucks. Plate numbers ending with 4x and 9x are currently not in use.

Typical 1-line license plate, having a size compliant with that of European Union license plates, 520 x 110 mm

Typical 2-line license plate, installed on imported vehicles that can't accommodate a standard 1-line plate. Size compliant with American standard 300 x 150 mm

Motorcycle, Moped, and Scooter License Plate. 165 x 175 mm

Antique Vehicle Registration Plates
Antique vehicles, which in Israel are vehicles over 30 years of age, may be specifically registered and carry special registration plates, which in addition to the registration number contain the words  (lit. "collectibles" vehicle). These vehicles, while exempt from annual registration costs, may not be driven on a public road between 07:00 and 09:00 on a workday. Since February 2011, self-imported antique vehicles are allocated a number plate with the 55 suffix.

Police registration plates
Typical 1-line license plate, having a size complaint with that of European Union license plates, 520 x 110 mm

Typical 2-line license plate, installed on imported vehicles that can't accommodate a standard 1-line plate. Size compliant with American standard 300 x 150 mm

Police registration plates are rectangular with red background and embossed with white registration number. Police registration numbers consist of the letter Mem (מ), representing the word "Mishtara" (meaning: police) and the number, which is issued according to the seniority of the car holder. The number of the main car of the General commissioner of the Israel Police is 1.

Military registration plates

Registration plates of Military service vehicles are rectangular with black background and embossed with a white registration number. Military registration numbers consist of the letter Tsade (צ), representing the word "Tsahal" (Israeli Defense Forces) and several digits. Alternatively, the plate might be painted on the vehicle.

Military Police registration plates

Military Police registration plates are rectangular with blue background and embossed with white registration number. Military Police registration numbers consist of the letters Mem and Tsade, representing the words "Mishtara Tsva'it" (military police) and several digits.

Diplomatic registration plates

Diplomatic Corps/Consular Corps registration plates are rectangular with white background and embossed with black registration number. Diplomatic/Consular Corps registration numbers consist of the letters CD/CC (respectively) and seven digits—the last two of them are 21 or 22. Private vehicles owned by a member of a diplomatic/consular mission and originally brought from the member's country of origin do not carry the letters CD/CC, but the last two digits remain 21 or 22. Honorary consuls' vehicles carry plates consisting of the letters CC without the final digits of 21 or 22, even though the vehicle is registered under a civil registration number.

7-Digit Format Registration Plates’ Suffixes in Israel

The use of the 7-digit registration plate in Israel began in 1980. It ended in 2018 for cars and buses, but still used for Taxis until all numbers in the 25 and 26 series run out. The 2 last digits of the number, referred to as its suffix, have special meaning. In the eighties, the suffix indicated the vehicle's manufacturing year (80-89). In 1990 this rule was changed, and the suffix was determined according to the car's dealer or brand, when each dealer or brand was given a suffix, sometimes sharing the same suffix with other dealers or brands. This rule was gradually changed starting from 2000, and the suffix started to indicate the vehicle's manufacturing year again (although not according to a general rule as in the eighties) as well as dealer or brand.

The following table details the registration plates’ suffixes in Israel against the vehicle's manufacturing year and the car's dealer or brand. The table details private and small commercial cars only. It does not indicate suffixes that were allocated to the Palestinian Authority in the past.

A list of Israel's car dealers and the brands they import follows this table.

Vehicle Dealers in Israel

Regulations

Regulations no. 300-301 state that every vehicle registered in Israel must carry two registration plates, installed on the front and rear ends of the vehicle (one on each) in the designated places by the manufacturer, or otherwise determined by the Licensing Authority. Motorcycles, trailers, semi-trailers, bicycles and tricycles must carry one plate only, installed on the rear end.

Registration plates must always be clean and must not be obscured by freight.

A damaged or vandalized registration plate must be replaced with a new one.

It is prohibited to remove a plate except for its replacement. It is also prohibited to add details to a plate, change its color or blur it.

A vehicle registered in Israel is allowed to carry Israeli plates only.

Electronic toll collection

When driving on an electronic toll collection route in Israel like Highway 6, the vehicle registration plate is electro-optically read at the entrance and exit from the route. Later, a clerk will manually enter the data into the database and subsequently, an invoice sent to the address of the owner of the vehicle, as it is registered in the database of the Ministry of Transportation.

See also

Vehicle registration plates of the State of Palestine
List of international vehicle registration codes
Electronic toll collection

Notes & References

External links
Israeli Ministry of Transportation and Road Safety 
Highway 6 operating company website 

Israel
Road transport in Israel
Israel transport-related lists
 Registration plates